Jack Johnson was a professional baseball left fielder in the Negro leagues. He played with the Detroit Stars in 1922.

References

External links
 and Seamheads

Detroit Stars players
Year of birth missing
Year of death missing
Baseball outfielders